Muhammad Zulfahmi bin Mohd Arifin (born 5 October 1991) is a Singaporean professional footballer who plays as a midfielder for Singapore Premier League club Hougang United and the Singapore national team. He is noted for being a technical player with set pieces and playmaking abilities.

Club career

Young Lions 
Zulfahmi began his footballing career with Young Lions in the S.League. After two seasons with the club, he was selected in the LionsXII squad for the 2013 season of the Malaysia Super League.

LionsXII 
Zulfahmi failed to play any part in the first 6 games of the season. He was given his first start against Pahang in the MSL on 16 February 2013. Two more appearances followed until a road traffic accident in mid-April set him back a month. He managed one further start and a substitute appearance on his return as LionsXII won the 2013 Malaysia Super League.

Zulfahmi's potential was recognised as he had a run of six starts in the beginning of the 2014 campaign. Poor performances however meant that he was dropped to the bench in favour of Firdaus Kasman for the next three games. He marked his return to the starting line-up on 22 March by curling a free kick into the PKNS net to score his first LionsXII goal.

Home United 
After LionsXII was disbanded, Zulfahmi went to sign for Home United for the 2016 S.League. He made 17 appearances for the protectors before leaving the club at the end of the season.

Hougang United 
Zulfahmi signed for the Cheetahs ahead of the 2017 S.League season, joining former coach Phillipe Aw.

Chonburi FC 
Zulfahmi's journey to Thailand happened after he made contacts with a Thai agent. Zulfahmi was on trial with second-tier Angthong FC who had wanted to start negotiations after a day. However, Zulfahmi, on the advice of his agent, traveled to Chonburi instead for a 4-day trial. After playing 60 minutes in a 2–3 friendly defeat to Thai Port FC, Chonburi offered him a contract which is only slightly higher than what he received at Hougang.

Zulfahmi became only the third Lion to play in the Thai top tier, after Hassan Sunny and John Wilkinson.  Zulfahmi made his debut in a 1–0 loss to Chiangrai United. He has started Chonburi's first two games of the Thai League 1, helping them to a draw and a loss.

Hougang United 
After spending a season with Chonburi, Zulfahmi re-signed for Hougang United FC for the 2019 Singapore Premier League season.

Suphanburi 
After a year back in his native Singapore, helping Hougang to a 3rd-place finish, Zulfahmi found himself back in the Thai League 1 after an agent contacted him about Suphanburi's interest. Suphanburi's coach Adebayo Gbadebo had watched videos of Zulfahmi's previous games before expressing an interest in signing him. Zulfahmi suffered a difficult 2020, playing just 8 of Suphanburi's 15 league matches in a disrupted season, having returned to Singapore in August to be with his ailing mother, who later died from breast cancer. However, he was a fixture of Suphanburi's midfield before and after he returned to Singapore. He started their first four matches before the league's coronavirus-enforced hiatus and, following his return to Thailand, he started three of Suphanburi's last four league games and came off the bench in the other one.

Samut Prakan City 
Zulfahmi signed a -season deal with top-tier Thai team Samut Prakan City, after his contract with Thai League 1 side Suphanburi expired. He will play alongside his international teammate, goalkeeper Izwan Mahbud, 30, who joined the club in September.

International career
Zulfahmi was first called up to the Singapore national team for a friendly match against Thailand on 24 August 2011. He was also part of the 2012 AFF Championship winning squad although he did not made any appearances in the competition.

Zulfahmi was handed his first international start against Laos on 10 October 2013.

Along with Hariss Harun, he has been identified by national coach Bernd Stange as the future of Singapore's midfield.

Zulfahmi had also been part of the Singapore squad for the 2014 and 2016 AFF Championships.

Zulfahmi scored his first goal after 40 appearances for the Lions in a 1–1 draw with Oman on 23 March 2019, scoring via a free-kick from about 23 yards out.

In 2022, Zulfahmi was included in the team for the 2022 FAS Tri-Nations Series and 2022 AFF Championship.

Singapore Selection Squad
Zulfahmi was selected as part of the Singapore Selection squad for The Sultan of Selangor's Cup to be held on 6 May 2017.

Career statistics
 26 Sept 2021

Club
. Caps and goals may not be correct.

 Young Lions and LionsXII are ineligible for qualification to AFC competitions in their respective leagues.
 Young Lions withdrew from the 2011 and 2012 Singapore Cup, and the 2011 Singapore League Cup due to participation in AFC and AFF youth competitions.

International

International goals 
As of match played 24 March 2019. Singapore score listed first, score column indicates score after each Zulfahmi goal.

Honours

Club
LionsXII
Malaysia Super League: 2013

International
Singapore
AFF Championship: 2012

References 

Living people
1991 births
Singaporean footballers
Singapore international footballers
Association football midfielders
Singaporean Muslims
Singapore Premier League players
Thai League 1 players
LionsXII players
Malaysia Super League players
Young Lions FC players
Chonburi F.C. players
Singaporean people of Malay descent
Footballers at the 2010 Asian Games
Footballers at the 2014 Asian Games
Southeast Asian Games bronze medalists for Singapore
Southeast Asian Games medalists in football
Competitors at the 2013 Southeast Asian Games
Asian Games competitors for Singapore
Singapore youth international footballers
Competitors at the 2021 Southeast Asian Games